Klaidi Shala (born 22 March 1998) is an Albanian footballer who most recently played for Teuta Durrës in the Albanian Superliga. He made his professional debut on 26 October 2015 as a 16 year old in a 2–2 draw against KF Laçi, where he started the game and played the full 90 minutes.

References

1998 births
Living people
Footballers from Durrës
Albanian footballers
Association football defenders
KF Teuta Durrës players
Kategoria Superiore players